Laoisioch Mac an Bhaird, Gaelic-Irish poet,  .

A member of the Mac an Bhaird family of professional poets, Laoisioch is known from two surviving poems, A fhir ghlacas a ghalldacht, Dairt sonn dá seoladh go Tadhg and Mo chean duitsi, a thulach thall.

References

 The Surnames of Ireland, Edward MacLysaght, 1978.

External links
 http://www.ucc.ie/celt/online/G402143/header.html
 http://www.irishtimes.com/ancestor/surname/index.cfm?fuseaction=Go.&UserID=

16th-century Irish-language poets
People from County Donegal
Year of death unknown
Year of birth unknown